Saradha Gangadharan College (French: Collège Saradha Gangadharan), is a general degree college located in Velrampet, Puducherry. It was established in the year 2001. The college is affiliated with Pondicherry University. This college offers different courses in arts, commerce and science.

Departments

Science
Physics
Mathematics
Information Technology
Computer Science

Arts and Commerce
Tamil
English
French
Corporate Secretaryship
Management Studies
Commerce

Accreditation
The college is  recognized by the University Grants Commission (UGC).

References

External links

Universities and colleges in Puducherry
Educational institutions established in 2001
2001 establishments in Pondicherry
Colleges affiliated to Pondicherry University